Blessing is a census-designated place (CDP) in Matagorda County, Texas, United States.

Blessing had its start when the railroad finally was extended to that point, and first settlers accepted the name "Blessing" after their first choice of "Thank God" was deemed unsuitable by postal officials. A post office called Blessing has been in operation since 1903.

Geography

Demographics
As of the census of 2000, there were 861 people, 300 households, and 230 families residing in the CDP. The population density was 423.8 people per square mile (163.8/km2). There were 334 housing units at an average density of 164.4/sq mi (63.5/km2). The racial makeup of the CDP was 72.01% White, 5.92% Black, 19.98% from other races, and 2.09% from two or more races. Hispanic or Latino of any race were 46.11% of the population.

There were 300 households, out of which 39.7% had children under the age of 18 living with them, 64.3% were married couples living together, 8.7% had a female householder with no husband present, and 23.3% were non-families. 20.7% of all households were made up of individuals, and 10.7% had someone living alone who was 65 years of age or older. The average household size was 2.87 and the average family size was 3.36.

In the CDP, the population was spread out, with 32.2% under the age of 18, 9.2% from 18 to 24, 26.5% from 25 to 44, 18.7% from 45 to 64, and 13.5% who were 65 years of age or older. The median age was 32 years. For every 100 females, there were 111.0 males. For every 100 females age 18 and over, there were 102.8 males.

The median income for a household in the CDP was $22,989, and the median income for a family was $27,431. Males had a median income of $25,833 versus $30,288 for females. The per capita income for the CDP was $10,980. About 26.0% of families and 24.2% of the population were below the poverty line, including 23.4% of those under age 18 and 32.0% of those age 65 or over.

Education
Blessing is served by the Tidehaven Independent School District.

The designated community college for Tidehaven ISD is Wharton County Junior College.

Notable people
Pudge Heffelfinger-first professional footballer died here in 1954
 Kelly Siegler, star of Cold Justice

References

External links

 

Census-designated places in Matagorda County, Texas
Census-designated places in Texas
Populated places established in 1903
1903 establishments in Texas